St Peter's is a Tyne and Wear Metro station, serving the University of Sunderland and suburb of St Peter's, City of Sunderland in Tyne and Wear, England. It joined the network on 31 March 2002, following the opening of the Wearside extension – a project costing in the region of £100million.

History
To allow for the re-building of the station at Sunderland, St. Peter's served as a temporary terminus for rail services operated by Northern Spirit between 25 February 2001 and 16 April 2001.

St. Peter's is located at the north end of the Monkwearmouth Bridge, a  railway bridge crossing the River Wear, built in 1879, and to the south of the former station at Monkwearmouth, which closed in March 1967.

It is located a short walk from the University of Sunderland's Sir Tom Cowie Campus at St. Peter's, which is about 750 metres to the east of the station. For the University of Sunderland's City Campus, the closest station is University. The station is also located near to the National Glass Centre, which is just over half a mile to the east of the station. Despite the station's name, St. Peter's is actually closer to the Stadium of Light than the nearby Metro station with the same name.

The station was used by 0.11 million passengers in 2017–18, making it the second-least-used station on the network, after Pallion.

Facilities 
The station has two platforms, both of which have ticket machines (which accept cash, card and contactless payment), smartcard validators, seating, next train audio and visual displays, timetable and information posters and an emergency help point. There is step-free access to both platforms by lift, with platforms also accessed by staircase. The station has free car park, with 23 spaces (plus four accessible spaces). There is also cycle storage at the station, with five cycle pods.

Services 
, the station is served by up to five trains per hour on weekdays and Saturday, and up to four trains per hour during the evening and on Sunday between South Hylton and Newcastle Airport.

Rolling stock used: Class 599 Metrocar

Art 

The station features the White Light art installation. Designed by British artist, Ron Haselden, it consists of illuminated ovals embedded into the glass floor, which change in intensity according to the strength of the wind.

Notes

References

External links
 
Timetable and station information for St Peter's

Sunderland
University of Sunderland
2002 establishments in England
Railway stations in Great Britain opened in 2002
Tyne and Wear Metro Green line stations
Transport in the City of Sunderland
Transport in Tyne and Wear
